Karolína Plíšková was the defending champion, but lost in the semifinals to Lucie Šafářová.

Šafářová went on to win the title, defeating Samantha Stosur in the final, 3–6, 6–1, 6–4.

Seeds

Draw

Finals

Top half

Bottom half

Qualifying

Seeds

Qualifiers

Lucky losers

Draw

First qualifier

Second qualifier

Third qualifier

Fourth qualifier

External linkls 
 Main draw
 Qualifying draw

Singles